Kristiyan Tafradzhiyski (born 10 August 1993) is a Bulgarian footballer currently playing as a forward.

Career
Born in Knezha, Tafradzhiyski joined the Litex Lovech Academy at the age of thirteen in 2006. His first association with the first team came in October 2010, when he was featured as an unused substitute in a league game against Slavia Sofia.

In January 2012, Tafradzhiyski was loaned out to fellow A Group club Vidima-Rakovski. He made his competitive debut on 3 March in a 3–0 away league loss against Litex. On 28 March, he scored his first goal in a 3–2 away loss against Kaliakra Kavarna.

In June 2012, Tafradzhiyski joined Akademik Svishtov on loan, where he spent three and a half seasons. In his first campaign with Akademik he scored 7 goals in the third division, helping the team gain promotion to the B Group. In the following season, Tafradzhiyski played 18 games for the club in second division, scoring three goals, but Akademik relegated at the end of the season. In the 2014–15 season, he finished as Akademik's top league goalscorer with 11 goals.

On 16 January 2016, Tafradzhiyski was loaned out to Sozopol for the rest of the season.

References

External links
 

1993 births
Living people
Bulgarian footballers
PFC Litex Lovech players
PFC Vidima-Rakovski Sevlievo players
PFC Akademik Svishtov players
FC Sozopol players
First Professional Football League (Bulgaria) players
Association football forwards